Wild Rivers is a water park in Irvine, California, United States. It opened in July 1986 on the site of the former Lion Country Safari. Following the expiration of its lease with The Irvine Company, it closed on September 25, 2011.  Since the closure, there have been plans to recreate Wild Rivers in Irvine on or near the Orange County Great Park, which have been under development. The developers secured full funding and commenced construction on July 1, 2021, confirming the park's reopening for Summer 2022. The new park has officially opened as of July 29, 2022 and is 50% bigger than the old park.

Original park

History
Before Wild Rivers was built, the land was a drive-through zoo called Lion Country Safari, which went bankrupt and closed in 1984. The park's owner still held 13 years on the original 29-year lease for the land, which he then subleased to the operators of the Wild Rivers water park, the Camp Frasier (later Camp James) summer camp and the Verizon Wireless Amphitheatre.

Construction on Wild Rivers "Mountain Top" which would serve as the launch point for their largest rides,  began in 1985 and the park itself opened in 1986. Congo River Rapids, Rattlesnake, and Python were the first large scale long form rides to open. 

In early 2011, Wild Rivers announced that it had lost its lease with The Irvine Company. Both the park and the adjacent Camp James were scheduled to close at the end of the 2011 season. The park was planned to be demolished with 1,750 apartments being built in its place. A new water park was planned to be built on public land near the Orange County Great Park, and was scheduled to open to the public in May 2014.

New water park at the Orange County Great Park

History
Since 2012, there had been attempts to redevelop Wild Rivers on or near the Orange County Great Park. A new Wild Rivers park was originally slated to open in May 2014, but it was then delayed a year later to May 2015 before it was cancelled altogether due to financial and land approval issues. In March 2016, the plans were revived and three months later, on June 26, 2016, the Great Park Board proposed two sites: one 35 acres and the other 60 acres. In late April 2017, Wild Rivers successfully negotiated a contract with the Irvine City Council, acting as the Orange County Great Park, paving the way for their return to Irvine as soon as summer 2019. As of March 2018, the park was planning on opening in a  site on the former Marine Corps Air Station El Toro at the eastern corner of Marine Way and Skyhawk, but were waiting on environmental studies and approval from the US Navy. In August 2018, Wild Rivers announced that the park would not open until 2020 at the earliest, and as of April 2019 they had not finalized the lease terms and environmental study, and their exclusive agreement to negotiate with the city had expired. In January 2020, the city reached a tentative agreement with Wild Rivers for a new  location within Great Park at the southern corner of Great Park Boulevard and Skyhawk, and the lease was approved in April. In July 2020, the park submitted plans to the city for review, and was planning to open in May 2022.

Construction of the park began in July 2021, after $60 million in financing was lined up, and 20 attractions were planned. Season passes for the 2022 season went on sale in November 2021.

Attractions

See also
 List of water parks

References

External links
Official website

History of Irvine, California
Water parks in California
Buildings and structures in Irvine, California
1986 establishments in California
2011 disestablishments in California
Defunct amusement parks in California
Amusement parks opened in 1986
Amusement parks closed in 2011
Tourist attractions in Irvine, California